Julie Gilligan was an American Democratic politician from Lynn, Massachusetts. She represented the 9th Essex district in the Massachusetts House of Representatives from 1961 to 1968.

References

Year of birth missing
Year of death missing
Members of the Massachusetts House of Representatives
Women state legislators in Massachusetts
20th-century American women politicians
People from Lynn, Massachusetts
20th-century American politicians